The Jangam or Jangamaru (ಜಂಗಮರು) are a Shaiva order of religious monks. They are the priests or gurus of the Hindu Shaiva sect. Jangamas are also gurus of Veerashaiva' sect
Jangamas are disciples of Lord Shiva as mentioned in Basava Puranas. A visit of a jangam to a house is treated as the visit of Lord Shiva himself and the jangam shall be given good alms and the jangam blesses the natives. The Jangam is the wandering holy man in Virashaivism. The meaning of word Jangam is 'moving linga' and considered superior to 'sthira linga'.
Jangama is one who is endowed with true spirit of Agamic knowledge, and has sacrificed his life for giving Samskara or good character building practices in all sections of the society including all Sudra castes without any discrimination.

Jangama is a community which has people who are engaged in professions like priesthood, religious preachings and some in various kings courts as advisors and some designated positions in various parts of India, mostly in southern India.
Priests who make poojas to lord mallikarjuna in srisailam & Varanasi belong to verrashaiva Jangam community.
Jangam are pure vegetarians and are forbidden to touch any non vegetarian food items, including egg

History
According to the Hindu history of India, Goddess Parvati had claimed that she had given birth to Lord Ganesh (elephant-headed Deity) when she died as Sati (previous incarnation who died by self-immolation). She told Lord Shiva. that he too should also create a similar lord. Lord Shiva proceeded to cut his thigh and his blood spilled on the lifeless statue known as Kusha which immediately came alive and was thereafter referred to as Jangam. The term 'Jangam' (or) 'Jangam Sages' in Himalayas, Kashi and Kumbh mela (or) 'Jangam Sadhu' in Hindu Temples (or) Jangam in Maharashtra, Madhya Pradesh and Gujarat (or)'Jangam Ayya (Acharya, full form of Ayya is Acharya)' Swamy, Tata,in Karnataka Priestly Section (or) 'Jangam Veerashaiva Pandaram' is Tamil Nadu Priestly Section and Kerala Priestly Section (or) Jangam Jogi in Haryana (or) 'Jangam Baba' in North India (or) Jangam Deva in Andhra Pradesh (or) Jangam Guru in Nepal are the different names given to the wandering Shivite (Hindu worshippers of Shiva) mendicants who are believed to be descendants of the original 'Jangam'. They function as priests or Guru for all those Lingayaths who follow the Shivite cult. In most of Shiva temples the Jangams perform the Pooja (prayer and worship of Shiva) as per ParameswarAgama. The Jangam priests may preside over all rituals however special regard is given to marriage rites in Lingayatism and Shaivism section of Hinduism.

Veerashaiva jangam worship is centred on the Hindu god Shiva as the universal god in the iconographic form of Ishtalinga. The jangam always wear the Ishtalinga held with a necklace. The Istalinga is made up of small blue-black stone coated with fine durable thick black paste of cow dung ashes mixed with some suitable oil to withstand wear and tear. The Ishtalinga is a symbolism for Lord Shiva. It is viewed as a "living, moving" divinity with the devotee. Every day, the devotee removes this personal linga from its box, places it in left palm, offers puja and then meditates about becoming one with the linga, in his or her journey towards the atma-linga.

Jangama Acharya (Ayya) in Telangana State 
Jangams hold intellectual history refers to the historiography of ideas and thinkers. The history cannot be considered without the knowledge of humans who created, discussed and wrote about in and other ways which were concerned with ideas. Jangam community were traditional religious mendicant class were considered auspicious in early time but during the colonial period were reduced to poverty. Most Jangama Devaras (Devullu)falls under priestly class of Agamic practices and understand difficult ideas, subjects and use knowledge to expand services as government advisors and political advisors.

Jangama is one who is endowed with true spirit of Agamic knowledge, and has sacrificed his life for giving Samskaras ( good character building practices in all sections of the society including all Sudra castes without any discrimination.

Main tenets of Jangam 
The Linga is tied to the womb in the 8th or 9th month of mother's pregnancy for the prospective child. Linga wearing ceremony to the child is thus performed before the child takes birth.

Lingayath or veerashaiva jangam worship is centred on the Hindu god Shiva as the universal god in the iconographic form of Ishtalinga. The jangam always wear the Ishtalinga held with a necklace. The Istalinga is made up of small blue-black stone coated with fine durable thick black paste of cow dung ashes mixed with some suitable oil to withstand wear and tear. The Ishtalinga is a symbolism for Lord Shiva. It is viewed as a "living, moving" divinity with the devotee. Every day, the devotee removes this personal linga from its box, places it in left palm, offers puja and then meditates about becoming one with the linga, in his or her journey towards the atma-linga.

Jangam history 
Jangam: Born out of Lord Shiva's Thigh and Religious priestly (by priest, religious prayer, prayer for healing, and Guru): Jangam sages, who claim they originated from a part (thigh) of Lord Shiva's body. Jangam claims that he is born out of the thigh of Shiva. Hindu history has it, Shiva wanted to give some donation to Brahma and Vishnu but when they refused he became so angry that it led to his creating the Jangam Sages. Jangam or Jangama over the generations have been able to maintain a distinct identity over generations. What sets them apart is their attire and the rituals that they follow. The Jangam sages go from one place to another and explain the different saints the story of the holy union of Lord Shiva and Parvati. With the Shivpuran (Lord Shiva) on the tip of their hand, enacting the epic tale for them is nothing but a piece of cake. Hindu history has it, Lord Shiva had blessed them with immortality but declared that they would live by religious begging in Lord Shiva temples (by priest, religious prayer, prayer for healing, and Guru ). Another version is that Lord Shiva at his wedding created two recipients of his alms, one Jangam, from the sweat of his brow, the other Lingam, from his thigh. These Jangams accept alms from devout. The jangams meanwhile suggest, they don't earn more money, a month. They do so by religious Prayer (The chanting of mantras) begging (by priest, religious prayer, prayer for healing, and Guru) in Prayer in Hinduism. At present, The 21st Century, Still now they (some Jangam) follows the Hindu history of Jangam i.e., according to Hindu history Shiva had blessed them (Jangam) with immortality (i.e., entire world is destroyed by nature or some other factors to destroyed the nature, Jangam will Live) but declared that they would live by Religious Begging in Lord Shiva temples (by priest, religious prayer, prayer for healing, and Guru) (The Lord's Prayer) after some religious event completed by them in Prayer in Hinduism.

See also
Lingayatism
Jangama dhyana
Burra katha
Shaivism
Veeragase

References

External links

Lingayat's Unique Symbol for Alimighty, Supreme GOD – Lingam and Jangam Guru 
 Jangam in Tamil Nadu (Madras Census Report, 1901)
Jangam Katha as art
Overview Of World Religions (http://www.philtar.ac.uk)
UNESCO -Intangible Cultural Heritage UNESCO- Jangam (https://ich.unesco.org/en/state/india-IN)
Jangama dhyana 
Ancient Jangam Burra Katha
Ancient Jangam Verragase Dance
Jangam Katha
Intangible Cultural Heritage – Jangam Gayan (http://ignca.nic.in)
Jangam Nepal 
Jangam Devotional Music
Intangible Cultural Heritage – Jangam (http://sangeetnatak.gov.in)
Vira Saivism: Jangam or Jangama  (http://www.saivism.net)
Jangam in Andhra Pradesh
Jangam in Haryana
Jangam in Kerala

Indian Hindu monks
Lingayatism
Shaivism